Janet A Franklin (born 1948), is a female retired swimmer who competed for England.

Swimming career
She represented England and won a bronze medal in the 100 yards backstroke event, at the 1966 British Empire and Commonwealth Games in Kingston, Jamaica.

She was the British number two for most of her career behind Linda Ludgrove.

References

1948 births
English female swimmers
Swimmers at the 1966 British Empire and Commonwealth Games
Living people
Commonwealth Games medallists in swimming
Commonwealth Games bronze medallists for England
Medallists at the 1966 British Empire and Commonwealth Games